Adrianus G. Jacobs (born 1936) is a Dutch businessman, the former chairman of Royal Dutch Shell from 2004 to 2006, and of ING Group from 1992 to 1998.

Jacobs has been a director of numerous companies. In 2002, Jacobs was inducted into the Insurance Hall of Fame.

References

1936 births
Dutch businesspeople
Living people
Shell plc people
ING Group
Place of birth missing (living people)